Greyfriars Kirkyard is the graveyard surrounding Greyfriars Kirk in Edinburgh, Scotland. It is located at the southern edge of the Old Town, adjacent to George Heriot's School. Burials have been taking place since the late 16th century, and a number of notable Edinburgh residents are interred at Greyfriars. The Kirkyard is operated by City of Edinburgh Council in liaison with a charitable trust, which is linked to but separate from the church. The Kirkyard and its monuments are protected as a category A listed building.

History
Greyfriars takes its name from the Franciscan friary on the site (the friars of which wear grey habits), which was dissolved in 1560. The churchyard was founded in August 1562 after Royal sanction was granted to replace the churchyard at St Giles' Cathedral in Edinburgh. The latter burial ground was not used after around 1600.

The Kirkyard was involved in the history of the Covenanters. The Covenanting movement began with signing of the National Covenant in Greyfriars Kirk on 28 February 1638. Following the defeat of the militant Covenanters at Bothwell Brig in 1679, some 1200 Covenanters were imprisoned in a field to the south of the churchyard. When, in the 18th century, part of this field was amalgamated into the churchyard as vaulted tombs the area became known as the "Covenanters' Prison".

During the early days of photography in the 1840s the kirkyard was used by David Octavius Hill and Robert Adamson as a setting for several portraits and tableaux such as The Artist and The Gravedigger.

Covenanters

The National Covenant was signed in the graveyard (as it was a place of legal free public assembly) in 1638. Whilst some depictions of the event show them leaning on table-stones, these stones did not exist at that time and the signing was done during the period of ban on central gravestones.

Following the Battle of Bothwell Bridge (22 June 1679), some 1200 prisoners were brought to Edinburgh. Their being too numerous for containment in the prison or castle a makeshift "prison" was formed in a field south of Greyfriars Kirkyard, to hold around 400 not containable elsewhere. This area was conveniently enclosed on two sides by the Flodden Wall and on a third side (the west) by the high enclosing wall of George Heriot's School. The fourth side faced the churchyard and was separated by an easily patrolled and guarded picket fence.

The name Covenanters Prison stuck. The bulk of the area was built on by the city Bedlam (around 1690). A remaining strip of land, sandwiched between the Bedlam and George Heriot's School, was used for additional burial ground from around 1700. The style at the time was to build in enclosed vaults, and this is the dominant form in this section. As the vaults did not exist at the time of the area's prison use, despite their potential to be used as prison cells, this was never the case.

The area was open to public view until around 1990, but was thereafter locked by City of Edinburgh Council to stem persistent vandalism and use by drug-users. The area is accessible during the day by special arrangement with the guides at Greyfriard Kirk during their opening hours and at night by going on a City of the Dead Tour where the Black Mausoleum can be visited.

Greyfriars Bobby
The graveyard is associated with Greyfriars Bobby, the loyal dog who guarded his master's grave. Bobby's headstone at the entrance to the Kirkyard, erected by the Dog Aid Society in 1981, marks his reputed burial place, however as there are no parts of the kirkyard that is not consecrated it is also believed he was buried under a tree outside the gates to the right of the current main entrance.  The dog's statue is opposite the graveyard's gate, at the junction of George IV Bridge and Candlemaker Row. The grave of a Pentland Hills Shepherd, "Auld Jock" (John Gray), where the dog famously slept for 14 years, lies on the eastern path, some 30m north of the entrance. The stone is modern, the grave originally being unmarked.

Monuments

Enclosed burial lairs are found mainly on the south edge of the graveyard and in the "Covenanters' Prison". These either have solid stone walls or iron railings and were created as a deterrent to grave robbing, which had become a problem in the eighteenth century. Greyfriars also has two low ironwork cages, called mortsafes. These were leased, and protected bodies for long enough to deter the attentions of the early nineteenth-century resurrection men who supplied Edinburgh Medical College with corpses for dissection.

The kirkyard displays some of Scotland's finest mural monuments from the early 17th century, rich in symbolism of both mortality and immortality such as the Death Head, Angel of the Resurrection and the King of Terrors. These are mostly found along the east and west walls of the old burial yard to the north of the kirkyard.

Notable monuments include the Martyr's Monument, which commemorates executed Covenanters. The Italianate monument to Sir George Mackenzie was designed by the architect James Smith, and modelled on the Tempietto di San Pietro, designed by Donato Bramante. Duncan Ban MacIntyre's memorial was renovated in 2005, at a cost of about £3,000, raised by a fundraising campaign of over a year. The monument of John Byres of Coates, 1629, was one of the last works of the royal master mason William Wallace.

Bloody MacKenzie's Tomb
In 2003, the distinctive domed tomb of Sir George MacKenzie was entered by two teenage boys, aged 17 and 15, via a ventilation slot in the rear (now sealed). They reached the lower vault (containing the coffins), broke the coffins open and stole a skull. Police arrived as they were playing football with the skull on the grass. The pair narrowly escaped imprisonment on the little-used but still extant charge of violating sepulchres.

Notable burials

(note-CP denotes graves within the sealed south-west section known as the Covenanters Prison)
 William Adam (architect) (1689–1748), with his son John Adam (architect) (1721–1792)
 William Adam of Blair Adam (1751–1839), judge
 Alexander Adie FRSE (1775–1859) optical instrument maker
 David Aikinhead (1566–1637), twice Lord Provost of Edinburgh, 1620–22 and 1625–30
 William Annand (1633–1681), minister and Dean of St Giles Cathedral
 Robert Baird of Saughtonhall (1630-1697) Cashier of the Scottish Carolina Company
 John Bayne of Pitcairlie (1620–1681), Writer to the Signet 
 Leslie Balfour-Melville (1854–1937) golfer
 John Beugo (1759–1841), engraver
 Joseph Black (1728–1799), physician (CP)
 Rev Hugh Blair (1718–1800)
 Sir James Hunter Blair, 1st Baronet (1741–1787)
 Robert Blair, Lord Avontoun (1741–1811) judge (CP)
 Very Rev Andrew Brown (1763–1834) minister and historian of Nova Scotia
 George Buchanan (died 1582), historian and reformer
 James Buchanan of Drumpellier (1726–1786) twice Lord Provost of Glasgow after whom Buchanan Street is named
 James Burnett, Lord Monboddo (1714–1799) judge (CP – unmarked)
 Sir John Byres of Coates (Coittes) (1569–1629)
 Robert Cadell (1788–1849), publisher
 Archibald Campbell, 9th Earl of Argyll (1629–1685), nobleman
 General Duncan Campbell of Lochnell (1763–1837)
 Very Rev Dr John Campbell (1758-1828) Moderator of the Church of Scotland in 1818
 Sir Hugh Campbell of Cesnock, covenanter and MP for Ayrshire (1615–1688)
 Aglionby Ross Carson FRSE (1780–1850), rector of the High School 1820–1845, author
 William Carstares (1649–1715), churchman and statesman
 Colonel Francis Charteris (1675–1732), notorious rake and member of the Hellfire club
 Robert Chieslie (c. 1650 - c. 1705) Lord Provost who lost a fortune in the Darien scheme and died in Darien House (the asylum).
 Prof Alexander Christison FRSE (1753–1820)
 William Colvill (d.1675) principal of University of Edinburgh, location unknown
 William Coulter, Lord Provost of Edinburgh (1808–1810)
 Bishop William Cowper (1568–1619)
 James Craig (1739–1795), architect and designer of Edinburgh's New Town
 William Creech (1745–1815), bookseller and Lord Provost of Edinburgh
 Andrew Crosbie (1736–1785), lawyer and founding Fellow of the Royal Society of Edinburgh (unmarked)
 Sir Hugh Cunningham of Bonnington (1643–1710), Lord Provost of Edinburgh 1702-4 (CP)
 John Dalrymple (1734-1779) Lord Provost 1770 and 1777 (CP)
 Prof Andrew Dalzell, FRSE Professor of Greek at the University of Edinburgh (1742–1806)
 Charles Kemp Davidson, Lord Davidson (1929–2009) Senator of the College of Justice
 Forrest Dewar (1748–1817) surgeon, President of the Royal College of Surgeons of Edinburgh 1786/88
 Alexander Donaldson (1727–1794), bookseller and publisher
 Admiral Sir Charles Douglas, 1st Baronet (1727–1789)
 James Douglas, 4th Earl of Morton (c. 1516–1581), Regent of Scotland
 Adam Drummond of Binend (1679–1758) Professor of Anatomy at the University of Edinburgh
 Adam Drummond (1713–1786)
 Very Rev John Drysdale FRSE DD (1718–1788) twice Moderator of the Church of Scotland in both 1773 and 1784, son-in-law to William Adam and buried in the Adam mausoleum
 Prof George Dunbar (classical scholar) (1777–1851)
 William Dunlop (ecclesiastical historian) (1692–1720)
 John Erskine (theologian) (1721–1803)
 Mary Erskine (1629–1708), founder of The Mary Erskine School (CP)
 Sir David Falconer (1640–1685), judge
 Sir James Falconer of Phesdo (1648–1706), judge and Senator of the College of Justice
 Sir Adam Ferguson (1770–1854) soldier son of Adam Ferguson (CP)
 James Ferguson, Lord Pitfour (1700–1777)
 Admiral John Macpherson Ferguson (1784–1855) younger son of Adam Ferguson (CP)
 John MacMorran (1553-1595), Burgh official shot by schoolchildren.
 Duncan Forbes, Lord Culloden (1685–1747), politician and judge
 Sir William Forbes, 6th Baronet of Monymusk and Pitsligo FRSE (1739–1806) and his son Sir William Forbes, 7th Baronet (1773–1828), banker
 Sir James Forrest, 1st Baronet (1780–1860), Lord Provost of Edinburgh 1837–43
 Alexander Forrester (1611-1686)
 Francis Garden, Lord Gardenstone (1721–1793) law lord (unmarked grave)
 William Ged (1699–1749), inventor of stereotyping (unmarked grave)
 Walter Geikie (1795–1837), artist
 Arthur Giles (1834-1921) Princes Street bookseller and printer.
 Adam Gillies, Lord Gillies (1760–1842), judge (CP)
 Dr John Gordon (1786–1818), anatomist and anti-phrenologist
 Lewis Duncan Brodie Gordon (1815–1876) civil engineer
 Very Rev Prof John Gowdie (1682-1762) Moderator in 1733, Principal of University of Edinburgh
 Admiral Alexander Graeme (1741–1818), naval officer
 James Gillespie Graham (1777–1855), architect (CP)
 Lord Patrick Grant (1691–1754), judge (CP)
 John Gray (died 1858), owner of Greyfriars Bobby
 John Hall of Dunglass (1650–1695) Lord Provost and his great grandson Sir James Hall (1761–1832) geologist
 Robert Hamilton (advocate) FRSE (1763–1831) friend of Sir Walter Scott
 Matthew Hardie (1755–1826) violin maker nicknamed the 'Scottish Stradivari'
 Franz Hedrich (1823–1895) German poet
 Alexander Henderson (died 1646), churchman and statesman
 Thomas Henderson FRSE (1798-1844) unmarked within the grave of his father-in-law Alexander Adie
 George Heriot (1540–1610) goldsmith, father to George Heriot
 Rev Prof John Hill FRSE (1747–1805) classicist
 Vice Admiral Sir George Home (1740–1803)
 Sir James Home (1790–1836)
 Vice Admiral Sir John Home of Blackadder (died 1803)
 John Hope (botanist) (1725–1786),his physician son, Thomas Charles Hope (1766–1844), his grandson, John Hope (lawyer) (1807-1893), and five other members of his family.
 Sir Thomas Hope, 1st Baronet (1573–1646)
 William Howison (1798–1850), engraver
 Alexander Gibson Hunter of Blackness (1771–1812) book collector and publisher in partnership with Archibald Constable
 James Hutton (1726–1797), geologist (CP)
 Sir David Innes (d.1866)
 Gilbert Innes of Stow (died 1832)
 George Jamesone (1587–1644) Scotland's foremost 17th-century portrait artist
 John Kay (caricaturist) (1742–1826)
 Alexander Kemp FRSE (1822–1854) chemist
 Robert Kerr (1759–1813) scientific author
 Rev James Kirkton (1628-1699) in the Trotter vault
 James L'Amy of Dunkenny FRSE (1772–1854) advocate and phrenologist
 John Law (c1632-1712) minister and prisoner on the Bass Rock
 Sir John Leach (1760–1834) judge, buried in the Adam mausoleum
 John Learmonth of Dean (1789–1858), Lord Provost of Edinburgh 1831–33 (CP) and his ancestor James Learmonth, Lord Balcomie
 William Little (1525–1601) twice Lord Provost of Edinburgh 1586 and 1591
 Sir George Lockhart (1630–1689), murder victim buried in Mackenzie's tomb
 Thomas McCrie (1772–1835), historian, and his son Thomas M'Crie the Younger (1797–1875)
 Alexander MacDuff of Bonhard FRSE (1816–1866)
 William McGonagall (1825–1902), poet 
 Duncan Ban MacIntyre (1724–1812), Gaelic poet
 Colin MacLaurin (1698–1746), mathematician, and his son John Maclaurin, Lord Dreghorn (1734–1796)
 Hugh Mackail, martyr (1640?–1666) minister hanged at the market-cross after being tortured with the boot
 Sir George Mackenzie (1636–1691), Lord Advocate
 Henry Mackenzie (1745–1831), writer and author of The Man of Feeling and his son Joshua Henry Mackenzie, Lord Mackenzie (1774–1851)
 Sir James McLurg of Vogrie (1629–1717), Dean of Guild, philanthropist, major investor in the Darien scheme (CP)
 John Manderston, Lord Provost of Edinburgh 1819–21
 Sir John Medina (1659–1710) prominent artist (the "sunken" vault on the east side)
 Alexander Miller (d. 1616), tailor to James VI
 Patrick Miller of Dalswinton (1731–1815) steamship inventor
 Alexander Moncrieff (1613–1688) prominent 17C minister, also grandfather of Alexander Moncrieff
 Mary Arbuthnot Moir (1804-1900) Friend of Walter Scott
 Robert Scott Moncrieff (1793–1869) advocate and amateur artist and his son Colin Scott-Moncrieff (CP)
 Dr Alexander Monro (1697–1767) and his son Alexander (1733–1817), famed anatomists
 Alexander Monteith (surgeon) (1660–1713) surgeon and apothecary
 Sir Harry Munro, 7th Baronet (1720–1781) military leader during the Rebellion of 1745
 Sir Archibald Muir, twice Lord Provost of Edinburgh 1691–92 and 1696–98
 Prof Alexander Murray (1775–1813)
 James Murray of Deuchar (1571 – 30 April 1649), wealthy merchant
 John Mylne (1611–1667), mason and architect
 Sir William Newbigging FRSE (1772–1852), physician
 Alexander Nisbet (1657–1725), antiquarian and author of A System of Heraldry (grave location unclear)
 John Nisbet (1627–1685), Covenanter, hanged at the Grassmarket
 William Oliphant, Lord Newton (1561–1628), judge
 John Paton, Covenanter and army captain, executed in 1684
 Archibald Pitcairne (1652–1713), physician
 Captain John Porteous (c. 1695–1736), soldier and lynching victim, after whom the Porteous Riots are named
 Gilbert Primrose (1535–1616) surgeon
 James Rae (surgeon) (1716–1791)
 Allan Ramsay (1686–1758), poet
 Archibald Riddell (minister) prisoner on the Bass Rock and covenanting minister at New Jersey and Edinburgh 
 General Henry James Riddell (died 1861) commander in chief of the Scottish army
 Thomas Riddell possible inspiration for J. K. Rowling's fictional character who cannot be named
 William Ritchie (1781–1832)) founder and editor of The Scotsman
 William Robertson D.D. (1721–1793), historian and his son Lt Col David Robertson MacDonald
 William Robertson (antiquary) FRSE (1740–1803)
 George Romanes FRS (1848–1894) (memorial only)
 William Roxburgh (1751–1815) botanist
 Thomas Ruddiman (1674–1757), classical scholar and grammarian
Gilbert Rule (1629 (approx) – 1701) minister and the Principal of Edinburgh University from 1690 to 1701
 Sir William Scott of Thirlestane (1670–1725) landowner and poet (CP)
 Sir Robert Sibbald (1641–1722) physician and botanist
 Henry Siddons (1774–1815) failed actor son of Sarah Siddons, and his wife Harriet Siddons
 Sir James Skene (died 1633) President of the College of Justice
 John Skene, Lord Curriehill (d.1617)
 William Smellie (encyclopedist) (1740–1795) creator of the Encyclopædia Britannica
 Sir James Spittal (1769–1842), Lord Provost of Edinburgh 1833 until 1837 and his son Dr Robert Spittal
Sir James Stewart (Lord Advocate) (1635–1713) location of grave unknown
 Rev Dr Matthew Stewart (mathematician) (1717–1785) father of Dugald Stewart (unmarked grave)
 James Stirling (1692–1770), mathematician
 Sir James Stirling, 1st Baronet (1739-1805) three times Lord Provost of Edinburgh and Sir Gilbert Stirling, baronet
 Rev James Struthers (1770–1807) famous orator
 James Stuart of Binend (1716–1777) twice Lord Provost of Edinburgh and his son Charles Stuart of Dunearn (1745–1826)
 Prof John Thomson FRS FRSE (1765–1846), President of the Royal College of Surgeons of Edinburgh
 Archibald Tod (d.1656), twice Lord Provost of Edinburgh 1646–48 and 1651–54
 Robert Traill (1603–1678), minister of the parish
 The Trotter family of Mortonhall 
 William Trotter of Ballindean (1772-1833), famous furniture maker and also Lord Provost 1825 to 1827
 William Tytler (1711–1792), his son Alexander Fraser Tytler (1747–1813) and grandson Patrick Fraser Tytler (1789–1849) (CP)
Barbara and Mary Walker of Coates, rich spinsters who paid for St Marys Episcopal Cathedral in the west of the city
 William Wallace (1768–1843), mathematician
 George Watson (1654–1723), accountant and founder of George Watson's College
 James Watson (died 1722) printer and publisher. Founder of the Edinburgh Gazette and Edinburgh Courant
 John Watson W.S. (died 1762), founder of John Watson's Institution, now the Gallery of Modern Art.
 John Wilson of Kilmaurs executed 22 December 1666 for his part in the Pentland Rising
 Patrick Wilson (1798–1871) architect
 Robert Whytt (1714–1766) physician and president of the Royal College of Physicians of Edinburgh (CP)
 Very Rev William Wishart (1660-1729) and his son (CP)
 William Wright (1735–1819) botanist

Gallery

References

External links

 Greyfriars Tolbooth & Highland Kirk

Category A listed buildings in Edinburgh
Cemeteries in Edinburgh
Old Town, Edinburgh
Tourist attractions in Edinburgh
1561 establishments in Scotland
Kirkyards in Scotland